AFAS Stadion is a stadium in Alkmaar, Netherlands. It is used for football matches and is the home stadium of AZ Alkmaar. The stadium is able to hold 19,478 people and bears the name of a Dutch software company. Due to UEFA's sponsorship regulations, the stadium is named AZ Stadion in European matches.

History
It officially opened on 4 August 2006 with a friendly against Arsenal. AZ lost 3–0, with Gilberto Silva scoring the stadium's first ever goal. The first Eredivisie game, against NAC Breda, was won 8–1 by AZ with German midfielder Simon Cziommer scoring a hat-trick.

AFAS Stadion replaces the club's former ground, Alkmaarder Hout. The main stand is called Victorie Tribune, the stand with the fanatic supporters is called Van der Ben Tribune (Ben-Side), the stand behind the other goal is called the Alkmaarderhouttribune, in honour of the former stadium, and the stand opposite to the main stand is called Molenaar Tribune after the founders of AZ. The official name is AFAS Stadion, but some supporters call it Victorie Stadion, a name that alludes to the turning point victory over Spanish troops besieging Alkmaar during the Eighty Years' War.

In order to further grow the club's budget, the AZ Board made the decision to increase the stadium's capacity to 30,000 seats. This was to be achieved by adding a second tier to 3 of the 4 stands, leaving the Victorie Tribune as is. Construction was to begin in the second half of 2010, but it never got underway as the club's main sponsor and one of the main financial contributors to the project, DSB Bank went bankrupt shortly before work started. Therefore, the capacity remained at 17,023.

On 10 August 2019, the roof of the stadium partially collapsed. No people were injured during the incident. As a result, AZ spent the rest of the year playing home matches at the Cars Jeans Stadion in The Hague.

During the 2020-2021 season, the stadium was renovated. A new roof has been put into place with a greater surface and the capacity was increased to hold around 19,500 fans.

References

External links 
  The stadium on AZ official site

AZ Alkmaar
Football venues in the Netherlands
Multi-purpose stadiums in the Netherlands
Sports venues in Alkmaar